Scoparia favilliferella is a moth in the family Crambidae. It was described by Francis Walker in 1866. It is found in Australia, where it has been recorded from Tasmania.

The wingspan is about 27 mm. The forewings are fuscous grey, irrorated (sprinkled) with white and with a black median streak, margined with fuscous. The hindwings are very pale whitish ochreous, tinged with greyish. The apex and upper part of the hindmargin are fuscous grey. Adults have been recorded on wing in December.

References

Moths described in 1866
Scorparia